John Sanders (1768-1826) was an architect and the first pupil of Sir John Soane taken on 1 September 1784. Sanders was born on 12 April 1768, the son of Thomas Sanders, a tallow-chandler of the parish of St Dunstan-in-the-East, London. He died at Reigate, Surrey early in 1826.

Sanders' principal buildings are the Royal Military Asylum at Chelsea (1801–03) and the Royal Military College Sandhurst (1808–12).

Sanders was the first president of the Architects' and Antiquaries' Club.

References

Sources and further reading

19th-century English architects
1768 births
1826 deaths
Architects from London